Mitsugi (written: 貢, 女貢, 貢宜) is a masculine Japanese given name. Notable people with the name include:

 (1916–1988), Japanese photographer
 (1926–1999), Japanese glassblower
 (born 1937), Japanese aikidoka

Mitsugi (written: 三ツ木) is also a Japanese surname. Notable people with the surname include:

 (born 1953), Japanese actor

See also
, former district in Hiroshima Prefecture, Japan
, former town in Mitsugi District

Japanese-language surnames
Japanese masculine given names